x3 Trouble is a Malaysian thriller-comedy film about three good friends staging a car heist. Directed by Patrick Yau, the film stars Dai Xiangyu, Rynn Lim and Jack Lim. It was released on 5 April 2012.

It was first screened in Taiwan and Malaysia, followed by Singapore.

Plot
Three buddies (Dai Yang Tian, Rynn Lim and Jack Lim) steal a luxury car, landing them into a whole lot of trouble with everyone they meet, including a brutal killer, one of the friends' former wife and a gorgeous woman (Landy Wen) who seems death-proof.

Cast
 Dai Xiangyu as 1st Friend
 Rynn Lim as 2nd Friend
 Jack Lim as 3rd Friend
 Landy Wen as Beautiful Woman
 Lim Yee Chung as Underwear Vendor

References

2012 films
2010s comedy thriller films
Malaysian comedy thriller films
Chinese-language Malaysian films
2012 comedy films